Rudziński (feminine: Rudzińska, plural: Rudzińscy) is a Polish surname. It may refer to:

 Michalina Rudzińska (born 2002), a Polish chess master
 Paul Rudzinski (born 1956), an American football athlete
 Witold Rudziński (1913-2004), a Polish composer and conductor

Lithuanized version of the surname, Rudzinskas may refer to:

 Alfons Rudzinskas, a Soviet sprint canoer
 Nikolay "Mykolas" Rudzinskas (1933-2006), a Soviet sprint canoer

Polish-language surnames